Emil Gustafsson (10 February 1884 – 9 June 1954) was a Swedish sports shooter. He competed in the 600m free rifle event at the 1912 Summer Olympics.

References

External links
 

1884 births
1954 deaths
People from Ronneby Municipality
Swedish male sport shooters
Olympic shooters of Sweden
Shooters at the 1912 Summer Olympics
Sportspeople from Blekinge County